Lake Tumba (or Ntomba) is a shallow lake in northwestern part of the Democratic Republic of the Congo, in the Bikoro Territory of the Province of Équateur.

The lake covers about  depending on the season, connected via the Irebu channel with the Congo River. Water may flow into or out of the lake through this channel depending on the floods. Lake Tumba has 114 species of fish and supports important fisheries.
The lake lies at the center of the Tumba-Ngiri-Maindombe area, designated a Wetland of International Importance by the Ramsar Convention in 2008.

Lake Tumba was explored in 1883 by Henry Morton Stanley.
The swamp forest surrounding the lake is inhabited by the Mongo people, who in this area are divided into two castes: the Oto, who farm, and the Twa, Pygmies who fish.

References 

Province of Équateur
Tumba
Tumba
Freshwater ecoregions of Africa